Lilacs in a Window is a painting by the American painter, printmaker, pastelist, and connoisseur Mary Cassatt which is in the collection of the Metropolitan Museum of Art in New York. 

It is one of the few still-lifes she executed and was originally owned by the Parisian art collector Moyse Dreyfus. Cassatt had been introduced to him by her Impressionist friends, and he became a friend and early patron. Cassatt included a portrait of him, Mr. Moyse Dreyfus, in her show at the Fourth Impressionist Exhibition of 1879.

It is on view in the Metropolitan Museum's Gallery 774.

Citations

Bibliography

External links
 SIRIS record

1879 paintings
Paintings by Mary Cassatt
Paintings in the collection of the Metropolitan Museum of Art